Măneşti may refer to several places in Romania:

 Mănești, Dâmbovița, a commune in Dâmboviţa County
 Măneşti, Prahova, a commune in Prahova County
 Măneşti, a village in Cuca Commune, Argeș County